Podol may refer to:

Places
 Gora-Podol, Belgorod Oblast, Russia
 Podol, Iran
 Podol, Nikolsky District, Vologda Oblast, Russia
 Podol, Vologodsky District, Vologda Oblast, Russia
 Podol, Russian name of Podil, Ukraine
 Vápenný Podol, Czech Republic

Other
 Battle of Podol

See also
 Podolia, a historic region in Eastern Europe